The Spaces in Between is an album by English saxophonist John Surman recorded in 2006 and released on the ECM label.

Reception
The Allmusic review by Thom Jurek awarded the album 4 stars, stating, "Surman may not record quite so regularly as he once did, but given how rich, varied, and thoroughly engaging and sumptuous this work is, we should perhaps celebrate the fact that we can savor his records rather than consume them".

Track listing
All compositions by John Surman
 "Moonlighter" - 6:19   
 "You Never Know" - 5:24   
 "Wayfarers All" - 5:56   
 "Now and Again" - 7:25   
 "Winter Wish" - 4:27   
 "The Spaces in Between" – 8:13   
 "Now See!" - 3:06   
 "Mimosa" - 4:36   
 "Hubbub" - 3:52   
 "Where Fortune Smiles" - 4:34   
 "Leaving the Harrow" - 6:48
Recorded at St Gerold monastery in Austria in February 2006.

Personnel
John Surman – soprano saxophone, baritone saxophone, bass clarinet
Chris Laurence – bass
Trans4mation:
Rita Manning, Patrick Kiernan – violins
Bill Hawkes – viola
Nick Cooper – cello

References

ECM Records albums
John Surman albums
2007 albums
Albums produced by Manfred Eicher